Veitongo Football Club is a football club from Tonga, currently playing in the Tonga Major League, the highest level of association football competition in Tonga.

In 2016 the team reached the qualifying stage of the OFC Champions League, but lost all three qualifying matches. They reached the qualifying stage again in 2017, but failed to qualify after drawing with Lupe o le Soaga. They again reached the qualifying stage of the OFC Champions League, but failed to qualify after drawing with Tupapa Maraerenga.

Honours
 Tonga Major League (8): 1971–72, 1978, 2015, 2016, 2017, 2019, 2021, 2022
 Tonga Challenge Cup (1): 2020

Continental record

Top goalscorers in Champions League
 Hemaloto Polovili (4)
 Vai Lutu (2)
 Lafaele Moala (2)
 Kilifi Uele (2)
 Halapua Falepapalangi (1)
 Sione Uhatahi (1)

Current technical staff

Current squad
Squad for the 2020 OFC Champions League Preliminary stage

References

Football clubs in Tonga